Atrichopleura is a genus of flies in the family Empididae.

Species
A. argyriventris Becker, 1919
A. burchelli Smith, 1969
A. caesia Collin, 1933
A. cana Collin, 1933
A. caudata Collin, 1933
A. cinerea Collin, 1933
A. citima Collin, 1933
A. compitalis Collin, 1928
A. congener Collin, 1933
A. conjuncta Malloch, 1931
A. crassa Bezzi, 1909
A. enarrabilis Collin, 1933
A. fausta Collin, 1933
A. guarini Smith, 1962
A. hirtipes Bezzi, 1909
A. jaffueli Collin, 1933
A. livingstonei Smith, 1969
A. mameluca Smith, 1962
A. mauhes Smith, 1962
A. mundurucu Smith, 1962
A. nitida Bezzi, 1909
A. prothoracalis Collin, 1933
A. scapulifera Bigot, 1889
A. schinusei Bezzi, 1909
A. spinipes Collin, 1933
A. tephrodes Philippi, 1865

References

Empidoidea genera
Empididae